Vallelunga Pratameno (Sicilian: Vaddilonga) is a comune (municipality) in the Province of Caltanissetta in the Italian region Sicily, located about  southeast of Palermo and about  northwest of Caltanissetta.  
Vallelunga Pratameno borders the following municipalities: Cammarata, Castronovo di Sicilia, Polizzi Generosa, Sclafani Bagni, Valledolmo, Villalba.

Hundreds of Vallelungesi settled in the cities of Buffalo and Batavia in the US state of New York in the early 20th century, both communities establishing societies dedicated to Our Lady of Loreto, patroness of Vallelunga at the Buffalo and Batavia churches (both named St. Anthony of Padua Church). The annual feast is celebrated on the fourth Sunday of September.

References

External links 
 Official website

Cities and towns in Sicily